Jennifer Caroline Eadie (born 8 August 1995) is a field hockey player from Scotland, who plays as a midfielder.

Personal life
Jennifer Eadie was born and raised in Glasgow, Scotland.

Career

Under–21
Jennifer Eadie made her debut for the Scotland U–21 team in 2014 at the EuroHockey Junior Championship II in Vienna.

Senior team
Eadie also made her senior international debut for Scotland in 2014, during a test series against South Africa in Pretoria.

In 2022, she was a member of the national team at the XXII Commonwealth Games in Birmingham. She was also named in the Great Britain training squad for the 2024 Olympic Cycle.

References

External links
 
 

1995 births
Living people
Scottish female field hockey players
Female field hockey midfielders
Commonwealth Games competitors for Scotland
Field hockey players at the 2022 Commonwealth Games
21st-century Scottish women